St. Cloud Technical and Community College is a public community college in St. Cloud, Minnesota, United States.  Founded in 1948 and formerly called St. Cloud Technical College and St. Cloud Vocational Technical College (and known as "Vo-Tech"), it is part of the Minnesota State Colleges and Universities system.  The college grants Associate of Arts, Associate of Science, and Associate of Applied Science degrees in several majors; the college also grants certificates and advanced technical certificates.

Athletics
SCTCC's athletics teams, nicknamed the Cyclones, play at the NJCAA Division III level. All the teams compete in South Division of the MCAC.

References

External links
Official website
Cyclone Athletics

1948 establishments in Minnesota
Buildings and structures in St. Cloud, Minnesota
Community colleges in Minnesota
Educational institutions established in 1948
Education in Stearns County, Minnesota
Two-year colleges in the United States